Lee Dae-hyung (Hangul: 이대형, Hanja: 李大炯; born July 19, 1983 in Boryeong) is a retired South Korean outfielder for the KBO League. Lee played 17 seasons in the KBO — eleven seasons for the LG Twins, one year for the Kia Tigers, and his final five seasons with the KT Wiz. He is third all-time in the KBO in career stolen bases. He batted and threw left-handed.

From 2007 to 2010, Lee stole at least 50 bases each season, three times topping 60 stolen bases. He led the KBO in stolen bases all four years.

On August 6, 2017, Lee ruptured the cruciate ligament in his left knee while stealing second base in a game against the SK Wyverns, causing him to miss the rest of the season. He never returned to form in the following two seasons, and declared his retirement at the age of 35 on April 10, 2020.

After Lee retired from playing baseball, Lee has appeared in many entertainment programs.

Filmography

Television show

Web shows

See also 
 List of KBO career stolen bases leaders

References

External links 
Career statistics and player information from Korea Baseball Organization

LG Twins players
Kia Tigers players
KT Wiz players
KBO League outfielders
South Korean baseball players
1983 births
Living people
Sportspeople from South Chungcheong Province